This list of Ports and harbours in Tanzania details the ports, harbours around the coast of Tanzania.

List of ports and harbours in Tanzania

References

Ports

Tanzania